Ludwig Bernhard Förster (31 March 1843 – 3 June 1889) was a German teacher. He was married to Elisabeth Förster-Nietzsche, the sister of the philosopher Friedrich Nietzsche.

Life 
Förster became a leading figure in the anti-Semitic faction on the far right of German politics and wrote on the Jewish question, characterizing Jews as constituting a "parasite on the German body". In order to support his beliefs he set up the Deutscher Volksverein (German People's League) in 1881 with Max Liebermann von Sonnenberg.

In 1883, Förster left Germany in order to emigrate to Paraguay. His anti-Semitic belief system had resulted in social ostracization and the loss of his teaching job.   After searching the country for many months, Förster found a suitable site to establish a settlement. It was 600 square kilometres and almost 300 kilometres north of Asunción. The settlement was to become known as "Nueva Germania". Förster returned to Germany in March 1885 and married Elisabeth Nietzsche on 22 May. The couple assembled a group of 'pioneers' who shared their anti-Semitic views and wished to live in a new 'Fatherland' where an Aryan could prosper. They travelled to Paraguay from Hamburg in February 1886.

The initiative was a failure for many reasons, not least the harsh environment. Förster, with unserviceable debts, drank heavily and became depressed.  He eventually committed suicide by poisoning himself with a combination of morphine and strychnine in his room at the Hotel del Lago in San Bernardino, Paraguay on 3 June 1889.  He was buried in San Bernardino. After his death, his widow Elisabeth wrote a book entitled Bernhard Förster's Colony New Germany in Paraguay. Intended to salvage Förster's reputation by portraying him as a hero, the book first appeared in print in 1891.

References 

1843 births
1880s suicides
1889 deaths
Antisemitism in Germany
Far-right politics in Germany
German emigrants to Paraguay
German nationalists
German schoolteachers
People from Delitzsch
People from the Province of Saxony
Suicides by poison